Antonio González de Balcarce (June 24, 1774 – August 15, 1819) was an Argentine military commander in the early 19th century.

González de Balcarce was born in Buenos Aires. He joined the armed forces as a cadet in 1788. In the battle for Montevideo in 1807, he was captured by the British forces and taken to England. After his release, he fought in the service of Spain during the Peninsular War against the Emperor Napoleon. Returning to Buenos Aires, he participated in the May Revolution in 1810. Subsequently, he was named second commander for the military campaign of the independentist forces in the Viceroyalty of Peru, where he won the Battle of Suipacha on November 7, 1810, the first victory over the Spanish royal forces.

Eventually, he was called back and became the Governor of Buenos Aires Province in 1813. In 1816, he served as the Supreme Director of the United Provinces of the Río de la Plata ad interim, and became the Major General of the armed forces the following year under the government of Juan Martín de Pueyrredón. According to historian William Denslow, Antonio Balcarce was a member of the well-known masonic lodge Lautaro. He took part in the crossing of the Andes to Chile and was San Martín's second-in-command during the battles of Cancha Rayada and Maipu.

He fell ill in Chile and had to return to Buenos Aires, where he died in 1819.

References

1774 births
1819 deaths
People from Buenos Aires
Argentine people of Spanish descent
Argentine people of Basque descent
Argentine generals
People of the Argentine War of Independence
People of the Chilean War of Independence
Governors of Buenos Aires Province
Supreme Directors of the United Provinces of the Río de la Plata
Burials at La Recoleta Cemetery
Patrician families of Buenos Aires